King's Highway 6, commonly referred to as Highway 6, is a provincially maintained highway in the Canadian province of Ontario.

Highway 6 was one of several routes established when Ontario first introduced a highway network on February 26, 1920, following several pioneer wagon trails. The original designation, not numbered until 1925, connected Port Dover with Owen Sound via Hamilton and Guelph. When the Department of Highways (DHO) took over the Department of Northern Development (DND) in 1937, Highway 6 was extended north through the Bruce Peninsula to Tobermory. In 1980, the entire length of Highway 68 on Manitoulin Island and north to Highway 17 became a northern extension of Highway 6. Small modifications were made to the route of Highway 6 in 1997, but it was largely untouched by provincial downloading.

Highway 6 is one of two highways in Ontario (the other being Highway 33) broken into two segments by a ferry. The Chi-Cheemaun ferry serves automobile traffic, connecting Tobermory with South Baymouth between May and October.

Route description

Port Dover to Hamilton
Highway 6 begins at Saint Patrick Street in the community of Port Dover, and stretches northward as a two-lane, undivided highway. The road travels into Haldimand County, through communities such as Jarvis and Hagersville, and the traffic flow increases. At Caledonia, the road bypasses the former Highway 6 section (Argyle Street) that passes the town centre of Caledonia and is routed outside the urban area Caledonia. This Caledonia Bypass was opened in 1983, and is a two-lane undivided freeway. The bypass terminates at Green's Road on the north side of Caledonia and Highway 6 proceeds eastbound on Green's Road for approximately 500 metres to Argyle St. North. Highway 6 then turns north on a four-lane undivided alignment for 5 km. Much of the old alignment north to near Rymal Road remains provincially maintained as unsigned Highway 7273. In Hamilton, Highway 6 now uses a new alignment from Highway 403 to south of the Hamilton Airport, connecting with the southerly leg to Caledonia and Port Dover. The new alignment opened as an undivided two-lane freeway in November 2004; it is expected to expand to a full 4-lane divided highway, and to extend to past Caledonia, by some time in the 2010s. As the road meets Highway 403, Highway 6 merges with Highway 403, and there is a concurrency for 17 kilometres within Hamilton. The concurrency ends at the Highway 6 junction, at the Hamilton/Burlington boundary, near the Royal Botanical Gardens where Highway 6 turns northward.

Hamilton to Guelph
Though most of the route is five lanes — two travel lanes in each direction, plus one centre lane for left turns — the section in Wellington County from Puslinch to Morriston has remained two lanes because of its route through several small towns and a lack of available property for widening; this area therefore suffers from significant congestion. A new alignment, connecting to the Hanlon Expressway at Highway 401, is being considered to bypass this troubled section. The section where Highway 6 is concurrent with Highway 401 has the highest AADT (Annual Average Daily Traffic), at 85,000 automobiles per day in 2002.

The section of Highway 6 between Highway 403 in Hamilton and Clappison's Corners (the intersection at Hwy 5 West) was converted in 2009 to a controlled access freeway with an interchange at York Road. The interchange opened on May 23, 2009, and simultaneously, the intersection where Northcliffe/Plains Road met Highway 6 was closed permanently. (A new service road was built on either side to connect Plains Road and various other residential streets to the York Road interchange.) This section of Highway 6 has two southbound lanes and three northbound, the extra lane being for trucks climbing the steep escarpment, as well as high mast lighting and a full concrete median barrier.

In Guelph, the road travels along the full length of the Hanlon Expressway - a 4-lane, controlled access and divided highway with mostly signalized level intersections. The Ministry of Transportation is presently investigating the possibility of changing these intersections into grade-separated interchanges. For 4 km Highway 6 is concurrent with Highway 7, from the Wellington Street interchange north to where the Hanlon Expressway ends at Woodlawn Road. At Woodlawn, Highway 7 turns west onto Woodlawn Road, while Highway 6 turns east onto Woodlawn Road. Following Woodlawn, Highway 6 then turns north onto Woolwich Street, leaving the city of Guelph.

Guelph to Owen Sound

As Highway 6 leaves Guelph and heads northwards through Wellington County, it narrows to two lanes and passes through farmland. The route meanders northward for  before entering Fergus, where it meets County Road 18 and County Road 19. North of Fergus, Highway 6 winds northwest for another 17 kilometres into Arthur meeting County Road 109 (former Highway 9) just south of the town. After exiting Arthur, the route continues northwest for  before entering Mount Forest and meeting an intersection with Highway 89.

The route enters Grey County as it curves and meanders northward into farmland. It progresses north for another 22 kilometres to Durham, where it intersects Highway 4. It continues for another  to Chatsworth, where it meets Highway 10 and travels northward concurrent with Highway 10 for  into Owen Sound. There it encounters an intersection, where Highway 10 ends; from here, Highway 26 continues runs north and then east to Collingwood and Barrie, while Ontario Highway 21 travels east and then south towards Sarnia. Highway 6 turns west onto Highway 21, forming the only wrong-way concurrency in Ontario (Highway 6 westbound traffic is labelled as going north, while Highway 21 westbound traffic is labelled as travelling south). The two routes pass through downtown Owen Sound and onwards into Springmount, where they disembark from one-another; Highway 21 continues west, while Highway 6 turns north into the Bruce Peninsula.

Owen Sound to Tobermory
At Springmount, Highway 6 ends its concurrency with Highway21, and continues northwards into the Bruce Peninsula. The road remains as a two-lane highway for its full length up to Tobermory. It passes through communities such as Shallow Lake, Hepworth, Wiarton, and Ferndale. It is named Berford Street in Wiarton, and 10th Street in Owen Sound. Along the road, Bruce Peninsula National Park can be found.
At Tobermory, the highway travels along Carlton Road and Front Street, where motorists must queue for the Chi-Cheemaun ferry to continue onwards to Manitoulin Island. The journey by ferry traverses waters of both Georgian Bay and Lake Huron, and takes approximately 1 hour and 45 minutes.
The ferry service is not available from mid-October to early May.

South Baymouth to McKerrow 

The Chi-Cheemaun ferry docks at South Baymouth, and Highway6 continues as a two-lane highway. Highway6 is both the main means of connection between Manitoulin Island and the rest of Ontario and the major highway on Manitoulin Island. Highway 540 and Highway 542 on Manitoulin Island link back to Highway6. The section from South Baymouth to the Highway542 junction has the least traffic on a given day, with an average of 610vehicles passing as measured in 2010.

Highway 6 continues north, passing through communities such as Manitowaning, Sheguiandah, and Little Current. At Little Current, Highway6 crosses the North Channel by the Little Current Swing Bridge,
which swings open for 15minutes of each daylight hour in the summer to allow boats to pass through the channel. As of 2021, studies by the MTO have proposed replacing the aging structure with a two-lane crossing.

After crossing the North Channel, Highway 6 climbs through the La Cloche Mountains near Whitefish Falls. Eventually, it arrives in Baldwin, north of Espanola, ending at Highway 17 in the community of McKerrow,  from South Baymouth.

History

Wagon trails
Prior to the establishment of Ontario's provincial highway network in 1920, the route that would become Highway 6 was composed of several early wagon trails created during the early settlement of what was then known as Upper Canada. These trails carved through an otherwise barren wilderness, connecting distant townsites: the Hamilton–Dover Plank Road between Port Dover and Hamilton, the Brock Road between Hamilton and Guelph, and the Garafraxa Road between Guelph and Sydenham (renamed to Owen Sound in 1851) — were opened in the 1830s and 1840s. Further north, the Southwest Diagonal and the Centre Road were built through the Bruce Peninsula in the 1840s and 1920s, respectively.

In 1837, Charles Rankin was hired by the Canada Company to survey a line between Guelph and a new town site on the southern shore of Georgian Bay known as Sydenham. The Canada Company was formed by several British investors to purchase, open, and settle the Huron Tract, a vast wilderness stretching from Guelph north to Georgian Bay and west to Lake Huron. Rankin's line crossed too many natural obstacles, a result of the tendency to build roads that were straight rather than following the natural topography. Consequently, a new line was surveyed in 1840 by the company's own surveyor, John McDonald, and construction along this new route began. Around the same time, the Van Norman Company constructed a plank road between Port Dover and Hamilton known as both the Hamilton Plank Road and the Dover Road. By 1848, the  Garafraxa Road between Guelph and Sydenham was completed.

The remaining section between Hamilton and Guelph, known as the Brock Road, was constructed between 1848 and 1850 over the Guelph and Dundas wagon road. The wagon road, merely a trail through the forest, was cleared by the Canada Company in the 1820s to connect the fledgling town of Guelph with the established harbour at Hamilton, thus encouraging settlers to venture inland.

Further north, the Southwest Diagonal was surveyed in 1842 by Charles Rankin to provide a short route from the Sydenham townsite to the Hepworth townsite. This route passed through a large swamp and as a result remained an unimproved one lane trail into the 1920s. The Centre Road, the spine of the Bruce Peninsula, was built by the Department of Northern Development in the early 1920s, providing access to communities north of Wiarton. The route followed a telegraph line between Lion's Head and Tobermory and opened up a large area previously accessible only by water.

The latter two would not be incorporated into the original route of Highway 6.

Provincial highway

When Ontario's Department of Public Highways first established a network of provincial highways on February 26, 1920 to be eligible for federal funding, it included the Hamilton and Dover Plank Road, the Brock Road and the Garafraxa Road.
These roads were assumed from the various counties that held jurisdiction over them – Norfolk, Haldimand, Wentworth, Wellington and Grey – throughout June, July and August 1920.

Within Wentworth County, the construction of the Clappison Cut through the Niagara Escarpment was underway by 1921, with the aim of bypassing the winding old route that is known today as Old Guelph Road. The new route, which travelled straight along the boundary between East and West Flamboro, was assumed on January12, 1921. The province and the City of Hamilton also constructed several new bridges across Cootes Paradise to create a new northwest entrance into Hamilton. The new entrance, connecting the Toronto–Hamilton Highway (later Highway2) with the incomplete route up the escarpment to Clappison's Corners, was ceremonially opened by the Minister of Public Works and Highways, Frank Campbell Biggs, on August23, 1922.
The Clappison Cut was completed and paved in 1924.

Clappison Cut construction, 1920–1924

Highway5 and Highway6 travelled concurrently from Highway8 (Main Street) in downtown Hamilton to Clappison's Corners when route numbers were assigned in 1925. This situation was short lived however, as Highway5 was redirected west from Clappison's Corners to Peters Corners to meet Highway8 on May25, 1927. Highway6, in turn, assumed the route of Highway5 south to Jarvis.
The route was extended further west in 1930, when the newly-renamed Department of Highways (DHO) assumed the road from Highway8 at Peters Corners to Highway24 west of St. George, as well as the Governor's Road between Highway24 and Highway2 at Paris. The  road between Highway8 and Highway24, through Beverley and South Dumfries was designated on June18, while the  section of the Governor's Road, along the boundary between South Dumfries and Brantford Township, was designated several months later on September24.
These two segments were connected by a concurrency with Highway24.
 Below the escarpment, the highway followed what is now the Old Guelph Road, meandering into Hamilton.

South of Hamilton, the road to Jarvis was numbered as Highway 5 when route numbers were assigned in the middle of 1925. Highway 5 and Highway 6 travelled concurrently from downtown Hamilton to Clappison's Corners. However, on May 25, 1927, several route numbers were revised, including Highways 5 and 6. Highway 5 was redirected west from Clappison's Corners to Peter's Corners to meet Highway 8. Highway 6, in turn, assumed the route of Highway 5 south to Jarvis. Exactly two weeks prior, on May 11, the Department of Public Highways had assumed the road between Jarvis and Port Dover; this also became a section of Highway 6, establishing its southern terminus for the next seven decades.

North of the escarpment to Highway 401, Highway 6 follows the same route that it did in 1920, the Brock Road. North of Highway 401, which didn't exist before the 1950s, the route continued through Guelph along what is now Gordon Street, Norfolk Street and Woolwich Street. This section has since been replaced by the Hanlon Expressway, built throughout the 1970s.

North of Guelph to Owen Sound, the route also follows the same route as it did in 1920, with some small deviations. The section from Fergus north towards Arthur followed the route was of the old Fergus and Arthur Road Company. A "cheap attempt" at paving had been made in the 1920s. The section was straightened, widened and paved with asphalt-based "penetration pavement" in 1930.

On April 1, 1937, the Department of Northern Development was absorbed into the Department of Highways, which subsequently took over many development roads as provincial highways. Most of the northern sections of Highway 6 were included amongst these. Highway 68 was designated from Little Current north to Espanola on August 11, 1937. Two weeks later, on August 25, Highway 6 was designated in Bruce County, from Wiarton north to Tobermory. The section within Grey County was designated several months later on November 3. The lone remaining section of what would eventually become today's Highway 6, across Manitoulin Island, was not designated until December 7, 1955. The entirety of Highway 68 eventually became part of Highway 6 in the early to mid- 1980.

Expressways and bypasses
Longwoods Road extension
Under the leadership of Thomas B. McQuesten, who would soon introduce the freeway to Ontario, a new grand entrance to Hamilton was planned. It would cross the Desjardins Canal and terminate at a traffic circle, with Highway 2 continuing east and Highway 6 north. This new road, known as the Longwoods Road Extension, was built partially as a depression-relief project in the early 1930s. Upon completion in 1932, Highway 2 and Highway 6 were routed off the Old Guelph Road onto the new route into Hamilton. This configuration remained until the construction of Highway 403 during the early 1960s, which was built over the Longwoods Road Extension.

Mount Hope Bypass

Due to the narrow spacing of buildings in the village of Mount Hope, a bypass of the village was built in the mid- to late 1950s. The original route is now known as Homestead Drive. The bypass opened on April 26, 1957, at which point the old routing was decommissioned. It was subsequently bypassed, when the new Highway 6 opened to the southwest of John C. Munro Hamilton International Airport, on November 26, 2004.

Hanlon Expressway

With the rapid suburban expansion of Guelph in the 1950s and 1960s, a revised transportation plan was conceived to handle the increasing traffic load. The Guelph Area Transportation Study was completed in 1967, and recommended a new controlled-access highway to allow through-traffic on Highway 6 to bypass the city. Route planning, engineering and design began on October 2, 1967 and was subsequently completed in 1969. Construction began between Waterloo Avenue and Stone Road in 1970; this section opened on June 28, 1972. The next section, from Stone Road to Clair Road, opened in October 1973. Work on the northern section from Waterloo Avenue to Woodlawn Road began in August 1974. It and the final section south to Highway 401 were opened on November 7, 1975.

Initially, the  road featured no interchanges. However, the MTO has long-intended to upgrade the route to a freeway. Construction of the Wellington Avenue interchange began in October 1998; it opened in July 2001. On April 30, 2012, construction began on the Laird Road interchange. It partially opened on the week of November 11, 2013, and was fully opened on November 29, 2013, in a public ceremony attended by local officials as well as Guelph MPP Liz Sandals.

Caledonia Bypass

In 1976, a corridor study was completed on Highway 6 between Port Dover and Hamilton, indicating a need for a bypass of Caledonia due to the aging multi-span bridge over the Grand River, to improve capacity to the developing areas of Nanticoke near Lake Erie, and to reduce the high-volume of truck traffic passing through the town. Construction began in late 1979 on structures to cross the Grand River and to carry rail lines and three crossroads over the bypass. The bypass was completed in the fall of 1983. The old route through Caledonia is now known as Argyle Street.

Downloading and changes since

On April 1, 1997, Highway 6 was decommissioned south of Hepworth to Highway 21. The entire length of Highway 70 was subsequently renumbered Highway 6 to rectify the discontinuity. On the same day, the section between the southern terminus at former Highway 24 to the west side of the Lynn River.

A new  segment of Highway 6 was opened to the southwest of John C. Munro Hamilton International Airport in 2004. This building of this route had been planned since the construction of the Caledonia Bypass in 1983. However, concrete plans were not announced until January 1993. However, it had already drawn criticism due to an old-growth forest located in the path of the route. The planned highway would cost a projected $100 million. However, these plans never came to fruition, and by 1997 a new, shorter route was in the planning stages. Construction of the $33 million route was announced on May 26, 2000 by Transportation Minister David Turnbull, and began in July 2003.

The new route was opened on November 26, 2004. The section through Hamilton at the time followed Upper James Street through the Claremont Access onto the one-way pairings of Wellington Street and Victoria Avenue then Main Street and King Street. It turned north on Dundurn Street and crossed Cootes Paradise via York Boulevard before turning onto Plains Road and meeting the current route at the now-closed intersection. The responsibility for this routing was subsequently transferred to the City of Hamilton.

In early 2002, it was announced that the section of Highway 6 north of Hamilton, from Highway 403 north to beyond Highway 5, would be widened to a five lane freeway. This work began in 2006, widening and dividing the highway up the Clappison Cut. The York Road interchange opened on May 23, 2009, following completion of this work. The Plains Road/Northcliffe Avenue intersection was closed the night before and a new section of Plains Road opened on the same day as the interchange. Highway 6 now features an additional northbound truck-climbing lane as a result of this $34 million project.

Future 
Three sections of Highway6 are undergoing planning as of 2022.
Highway6 South (from Upper James Street south of Mt. Hope to Highway403) is proposed four-laning around John C. Munro Airport that is undergoing preliminary design as of February17, 2022
The Morriston Bypass (from Maddaugh Road, south of Puslinch, to Highway401 west of Morriston) is a proposed new two or four lane alignment of Highway6 currently in early works construction.
The Hanlon Expressway Mid-Block Interchange project will result in a new interchange between Wellington County Road34 and Maltby Road, as well as the removal of the existing intersections between the Hanlon Expressway and those two roads. A design–build contract for this work was awarded in February 2022.

Major intersections 

{{jctgap
| col              = 2
| text             = Georgian Bay</td>
}}

References

External links

Highway 6 - Length and route

006
Roads in Hamilton, Ontario
Transport in Guelph
Roads in Wellington County, Ontario
Transport in Grey County
Transport in Owen Sound